A gat (Seegat or diminutive Gatje) is a strait that is constantly eroded by currents flowing back and forth, such as tidal currents. It is usually a relatively narrow but deep, up to  passage between land masses (such as an island and a peninsula) or shallow bars in an area of mudflats. A gat is sometimes a shallower passage on lagoon coasts, including those without any tidal range. 

According to Whittow a gat is either an inshore channel or strait dividing offshore islands from the mainland e.g. the Frisian Islands, or it is an opening in a line of sea cliffs allowing access to the coast from inland. It is similar, but not identical, to a gut, which is a narrow river channel or strait prior to joining an open ocean or estuary. Leser restricts its use to deep, but relatively narrow inlets in the Wadden Sea that are scoured out by currents, giving the example of the gap between the Frisian islands of Juist and Nordeney.

Description 

The comparatively large quantities of water that flow quite quickly through a gat cause heavy erosion that results in a channel deeper than the rest of the surrounding seabed and also endangers neighbouring islands. When the water masses from mud flats behind the islands surge out again into the sea as ebb currents, they flow rapidly again through the narrow gat. But as these water masses break out into the open sea, they spread out and slow down. As a result, on this seaward side of the gat, the particles of sand and mud carried with the water settle and form an ebb delta with its shallower waters between the islands. The sandbanks so formed are often known in Germany as plate (pronounced "plah-ter", see Kachelotplate). The point where the water pouring out of the gat runs over these banks, which often lie in an arc between the islands, is the sand bar. This is the shallowest part of the gat for shipping, but also the deepest point on the shallowest line between the islands. A flood delta is formed in a similar way on the landward side of the gat.

A navigation channel to the open sea is usually marked out in the gats by the waterway and shipping authorities. The area of the bar is usually the most dangerous spot; this is where rip tides and, especially when the current flows against the wind, very dangerous ground swells may occur.

Passages between inner and outer coastal waters, such as at the ends of spits of lagoons or along bodden coasts are also referred to as gats.

The term "gat" is primarily (though not exclusively) applied to waterways of the North Sea and Baltic Sea coasts of Europe. A similar term of related but not identical meaning, gut, is mainly applied to channels of the coastal waters of the Atlantic coast of North America.

Etymology
The name comes from the Low German and Dutch word "gat" which means "gap". "Gat" is incorporated into some Dutch or Dutch-derived proper names of passages (e. g. Kattegat, Veerse Gat) which may or may not be proper gats. In English names, both "gat" (e. g. Fisherman's Gat) and "gut" (e. g. Digby Gut, Hull Gut, Gut of Canso) are seen.

In German, "Gat" (as well as "Seegatt" and the diminutive "Gatje") can refer to an arm of the sea which is not necessarily subject to strong tidal currents; for instance, the Prerower Strom ("Prerow Stream"), which is a regressive delta, is a gat. Seegatt (also "Neues [Pillauer] Tief" [New {Pillau} Deep]) is the German proper name of the Strait of Baltiysk (Pillau) which connects the Vistula Lagoon to the Baltic Sea.

The name of Hell Gate, a gat (or gut) in the East River of New York City, is derived from archaic Dutch Hellegat (meaning possibly "clear opening"), a fairly common toponym (place name) for waterways in the Low Countries.

List of gats 
The following is a list of gats, including named gats that may or may not be true gats as defined above:

German Bight 

 Blindes Randzelgat
 Dukegat
 Dwarsgat
 Emshörngat
 Evermannsgat

 Großputengat
 Haaksgat
 Harle-Seegatt
 Homme Gat
 Horsborngat

 Hubertgat
 Hungat
 Kalfamergat
 Nordergat
 Norderneyer Seegat

 Otzumer Balje
 Randzelgat
 Riffgat
 Rütergat
 Skittgat

 Spaniergat
 Stickers Gat
 Wagengat
 Wichter Ee

Netherlands 

 Amelander Gat
 Duinkers Gat
 East Gat, West Cappel
 Eijerlandse Gat
 Homme Gat

 Molengat
 North Gat, Texel
 Russian Gat, Vlie
 Schulpe Gat
 Veer Gat

Baltic Sea
 Kattegat (not strictly a gat despite its name)
 Seegatt

United Kingdom 
 Cockle Gat, Yarmouth
 Fisherman's Gat, Thames Estuary
 Foulger's Gat, Thames Estuary
 Hasborough Gat, Yarmouth
 Nicholas Gat, Yarmouth

See also 
 Gut (coastal geography)

References 

Coastal and oceanic landforms
Wadden Sea
Coastal geography